Timelotem is a benzodiazepine derivative with an unusual activity profile. Unlike most benzodiazepines, timelotem has little or no activity at the GABAA receptor, but instead acts as an atypical antipsychotic drug with similar pharmacology and effects to the structurally related drug clozapine. It has two enantiomers, but has only been studied as the racemic mix.

See also
 Olanzapine

References

Benzodiazepines
Fluoroarenes
Thiophenes